The 1956 United States presidential election in Wisconsin was held on November 6, 1956 as part of the 1956 United States presidential election. State voters chose 12 electors to the Electoral College, who voted for president and vice president.

Background
Politics in Wisconsin since the Populist movement had been dominated by the Republican Party. The Democratic Party became uncompetitive away from the Lake Michigan coast as the upper classes, along with the majority of workers who followed them, fled from William Jennings Bryan's agrarian and free silver sympathies. Although the state did develop a strong Socialist Party to provide opposition to the GOP, Wisconsin developed the direct Republican primary in 1903 and this ultimately created competition between the "League" under Robert M. La Follette, and the conservative "Regular" faction. This ultimately would develop into the Wisconsin Progressive Party in the late 1930s, which was opposed to the conservative German Democrats and to the national Republican Party, and allied with Franklin D. Roosevelt at the federal level.

During the two wartime elections, the formerly Democratic German counties in the east of the state – which had been powerfully opposed to the Civil War because they saw it as a "Yankee" war and opposed the military draft instituted during it – viewed Communism as a much greater threat to America than Nazism and consequently opposed President Roosevelt's war effort. Consequently, these historically Democratic counties became virtually the most Republican in the entire state, and became a major support base for populist conservative Senator Joe McCarthy, who became notorious for his investigations into Communists inside the American government. The state's populace's opposition to Communism and the Korean War turned Wisconsin strongly to Republican nominee Dwight D. Eisenhower in the 1952 presidential election.

For the 1956 rematch, Democratic nominee Adlai Stevenson II began by campaigning against Eisenhower's handling of farm problems, at a time when most of the interior United States was suffering from a severe drought. The Democrat would then attack Eisenhower as a "weak" President when the two were touring the Midwest during September.

Vote
Early polls showed Eisenhower leading the state despite farm unrest, owing to the unpopularity of Stevenson. No later poll was taken, but evidence was that state's farmers were not trending to Stevenson at all, and that the Suez Crisis would hurt rather than help Stevenson.

As it turned out, Eisenhower slightly improved upon his 1952 margin in Wisconsin: although he did lose some support in the farming areas, he gained upon his 1952 vote in Wisconsin's cities due to increased Catholic support, and carried all but two northern counties. Wisconsin’s result was 8.34% more Republican than the nation-at-large. , this remains the last time a Republican has carried Wisconsin by double digits, as the state would trend Democratic beginning with the 1958 midterm elections, although Democrats have subsequently won Wisconsin by double digits just three times – Lyndon B. Johnson in 1964, Bill Clinton in 1996 and Barack Obama in 2008. This is also the last election as of 2020 in which Portage County, Ashland County, Milwaukee County, and Dane County voted for a Republican presidential candidate.

Results

Results by county

See also
 United States presidential elections in Wisconsin

Notes

References

Wisconsin
1956
1956 Wisconsin elections